Electric World is a double album by Neal Schon. It was released in 1997 on Higher Octave. In a hard rock style, the album is influenced by Carlos Santana.

Track listing
All tracks composed by Neal Schon and Walker; except where indicated
"Night Spirit" -	(Len, Schon) 	3:47
"N.Y.C." - 4:43
"Highway 1" - 4:29
"Electric World" - 6:03
"Gypsy Dance" - 6:15
"My Past Life" - 6:12
"Memphis Voodoo" - 4:50
"Breaking Waves" - 5:48
"Midnight Express" 	- (Len, Schon) 	5:10
"Living Desert" -	(Schon) 	2:29
"The Dragon" - 7:22
"Medicine Man" - 4:57
"The Emperor" - 4:50
"Emerald Forest" - 5:38
"One and Only" - 6:56
"High Mileage" - 8:12
"Scram" 	- 5:09
"Mandolin Sky" -	(Schon) 	1:55
"Eye on the World"  - (Len, Schon) 	10:40
"All Our Yesterdays"   -	(Len, Schon) 	3:33
"A Prayer for Peace"  -	(Len, Schon) 	3:44

References

External links
Album at Last.fm

1997 albums
Neal Schon albums
Jazz fusion albums by American artists
Virgin Records albums